Leggett Valley Unified School District is a public school district based in Mendocino County, California, United States.

References

External links 
 

School districts in Mendocino County, California
Education in Mendocino County, California